The 2008 UCI Women's Road World Cup is the 11th edition of the UCI Women's Road World Cup. The calendar remains close to the 2007 UCI Women's Road World Cup with the addition of the Trofeo Alfredo Binda-Comune di Cittiglio and a team time trial event in conjunction with the Open de Suède Vårgårda.

Races

UCI Women's Teams

Final results

Individual

References

External links
Official site

 
World Cup, UCI Women's Road Cycling
UCI Women's Road World Cup